Grzymisław (1153/1158 – 1207/1209) was a duke from the Samboride dynasty. He was a steward of Świecie and Lubiszewo within the Duchy of Pomerelia.

History 
He came from the Samboride dynasty and was born between 1153 and 1158. He was a steward of Świecie and Lubiszewo within the Duchy of Pomerelia, under the rule of the Kingdom of Poland. The first record of his name comes from the year 11 November 1198. Originally, the seat of his part of the duchy was located in Starogard, but later he moved it to Świecie. After 1195, he had married Dobrosława, with whom he had daughters, one of which possibly could be Zwinisława, wife of Mestwin I. Grzymisław died between 1207 and 1209. He was succeeded by Mestwin I.

References 

Dukes of Pomerania
Samborides
1150s births
1200s deaths
Year of birth uncertain
Year of death uncertain